A fruit and walnut salad is any salad made with fruit and walnuts. Unlike traditional salads, lettuce is generally not a major ingredient, and is sometimes not included at all. It can specifically refer to:
Waldorf salad, a salad originally created in 1896 at the Waldorf-Astoria Hotel in New York City.
McDonald's Fruit and Walnut Salad, a salad added to the menu of fast-food restaurant chain McDonald's in 2005 and removed in 2013.

Fruit salads
Vegetable dishes
Walnut dishes
American salads